Munich is a 2017 historical novel by English writer Robert Harris. The novel is set in September 1938 over four days in the context of the Munich Agreement. The two main characters, both fictional, are Hugh Legat, private secretary to Neville Chamberlain, and Paul Hartmann, a German junior diplomat and member of an anti-Hitler group. Legat and Hartmann are friends from their student days at Balliol College, Oxford University. On 21 September 2017, an article in the Evening Standard asserted that the Paul Hartmann character was based on Adam von Trott zu Solz.

Film 

The novel was made into a 2021 German/British drama film for Netflix.

References

2017 British novels
Novels by Robert Harris
Fiction set in 1938
Munich Agreement
Hutchinson (publisher) books